Vedaprofen is a nonsteroidal anti-inflammatory drug (NSAID) used in veterinary medicine for the treatment of pain and inflammation due to musculoskeletal disorders in dogs and horses and for the treatment of pain due to horse colic.

Synthesis

References

Nonsteroidal anti-inflammatory drugs
Carboxylic acids
Naphthalenes